The Invisible Life of Addie LaRue is a fantasy novel by the American author V. E. Schwab. It was published by Tor Books on October 6, 2020. The story follows a young French woman in 1714 who makes a bargain with the Dark that makes her immortal, but curses her to be forgotten by everyone she meets. It was heavily praised and nominated for the 2021 Locus Award for Best Fantasy Novel.

Plot 
The story is balanced between a narrative in present day New York City and flashbacks starting from Addie's childhood in France to her experiences traveling the world and witnessing major historical events.

It begins in the early 1700s, following Addie as a young woman burdened by a forced marriage and praying to the gods for her freedom. She accidentally catches the attention of a god of the night, who she would later name Luc, who promises her the time she wants with the caveat being nobody will ever remember her after one encounter.  Over time she subtly influences many people, making marks in history and inspiring the creation of songs and art about her.

Luc visits her every year after they make their deal, asking for her soul, but she refuses every time. The pair develop a relationship over time that carries on for about two decades.  It ends abruptly when Luc asks again for her to surrender her soul, as Addie believes their relationship was just a gambit.

In 2014, Addie meets a man named Henry Strauss who can somehow remember her and speak her name. The pair become romantically involved until the day that Addie realizes that Henry only has 35 days left to live per conditions of his deal with Luc.

Due to heavy familial pressures placed on him, Henry had felt bogged down in his life, and a failed proposal made him attempt suicide. Luc visited him and granted his wish: whenever someone would see him, they would see what they desire the most. This allowed Henry to remember Addie, fulfilling her wish that somebody would remember her.

At the novel's end, Addie sacrifices herself to Luc, agreeing to be his so long as he wants her at his side. She does not surrender her soul as Luc no longer wants it, claiming to be in love with her.  Luc agrees to this in exchange for Henry's freedom with Addie's condition that Henry remember her. Henry publishes the stories Addie told him of her past in a book called The Invisible Life of Addie LaRue, which is an instant success. Addie has hope that she can manipulate Luc to let her go and finally have peace.

Reception 
The Invisible Life of Addie LaRue was on the New York Times Best Seller list for 37 consecutive weeks through July 2021.

Caitlyn Paxson at NPR praised the novel, particularly the attention to art: "her seven signature freckles...she has attempted to imprint herself in an artist's mind...fleeting impressions of a forgotten immortal. Together, they give us a sweeping feeling of urgency as we understand Addie's longing to be remembered in such a concrete and visceral way." 

Kirkus Reviews labeled the novel a "spellbinding story" that would have readers "stay up all night reading—rich and satisfying and strange and impeccably crafted." Ellen Morton from The Washington Post called it a "tour de force," commending the momentum, contemplative story, and explorations of identity.

Megan Kallstrom of Slate noted the story's careful attention to detail, ending her review by saying: "Much like the seven freckles that sprinkle Addie’s face, we create our own constellations, and as we live through these darkened days, I feel brighter for having added Addie to mine."

Film adaptation 
In November 2021, it was announced that eOne will produce a film adaptation of the novel. Schwab is reported to have penned the early drafts of the screenplay before handing it off to husband-wife duo Augustine Frizzell and David Lowery; the former of the two will also direct the film. Alan Siegel, Danielle Robinson, Gerard Butler, as well as Schwab will act as producers on the project.

References

2020 American novels
2020 fantasy novels
Tor Books books